Alchemilla flabellata, the fan lady's mantle, is a species of flowering plant in the family Rosaceae. It is native to central and southern Europe, Ukraine, and possibly central European Russia, and is locally extinct in Czechoslovakia. It prefers to grow in mountainous areas in calcareous meadows.

References

External links
 Alchemilla flabellata

flabellata
Flora of Spain
Flora of France
Flora of Germany
Flora of Poland
Flora of Switzerland
Flora of Austria
Flora of Southeastern Europe
Flora of Ukraine
Plants described in 1891